Onondaga Community College (OCC) is a public community college that serves Onondaga County, New York, at two campuses. It is part of the State University of New York (SUNY) system.

History 
The college was founded in 1961 and began instruction in September 1962 in the rehabilitated L.C. Smith factory (the now demolished Midtown Plaza) in downtown Syracuse. With an initial enrollment of approx. 500 students, The original graduating class of 1964 numbered 160.

Due to demands for more space and increased enrollment, a new site was chosen on Onondaga Hill where the college is situated now. The college was built in 1970 and library was erected in 1962 OCC opened its first Residence Halls in August 2006.

Campuses 
The college has two campuses. The main campus is on West Seneca Turnpike in the hamlet of Onondaga Hill, west of Syracuse; OCC@Liverpool (formerly called the North Site) is on County Route 57 in Liverpool, New York.

Organization and administration 

Onondaga Community College is a 2-year college and is part of the State University of New York (SUNY) system and one of 30 locally sponsored community colleges throughout New York State.

Academics 
OCC offers a number of areas of study for Career or Transfer programs. Some of these areas are: Art, Design, Media & Music; Business; Computing & Applied Technologies; Education; Health; Liberal Arts; Math, Science & Engineering; Public Safety & Community Service.
The college is a training center for the National Alternative Fuels Training Consortium.

Student life

Arts
In 2001, OCC started the Arts Across Campus program that showcases artists from various art fields. Each year they may have a variety of art exhibits, concerts, performances, and lectures.
The music program is one of OCC's most well-known and it offers various opportunities. The faculty is made up of accomplished musicians, such as members of Symphoria (previously the Syracuse Symphony Orchestra) and of the Society for New Music. The school offers extra-curricular activities, such as an indoor drumline, which has competed in the WGI world prelims in the Independent Open Class. The school holds music festivals such as JazzFest and the Central New York Day of Percussion, where world class acts such as Victor Wooten, Tommy Igoe, Aretha Franklin, and others come to perform and to give clinics.

Media
Students in the Electronic Media Communications department learn how to tape video, to edit, to direct, and to produce shows for television, many of which are broadcast across the campus' television network. Students can choose one of three curricula: television, digital audio, or digital media. The facilities of EMC include a full TV studio with Program Control and Master Control rooms, audio recording rooms, and non-linear editing (NLE) and digital audio workstation (DAW) labs. The EMC program also offers students the opportunity of taking part in its student run internet radio station, known as Supermix. The station follows an alternative and independent rock format and it also includes various specialty shows that range from sports, hip hop, metal, and country. The station also broadcasts Onondaga Lazers home games and. The station is broadcast through its website Supermix.us, iTunes, the campus' television network, and the Tune In app on smart phones.

Athletics 
OCC's has 17 athletic teams, which are nicknamed The Lazers. Several of Onondaga's athletic teams are consistently nationally ranked, and have won 16 national championships. Various indoor events are held at SRC Arena and Events Center, a  facility with seating for 6,500 people. Onondaga is a member of the Mid-State Athletic Conference.

Lacrosse 
The 2006 and 2007 men's lacrosse team won the NJCAA national championship in May 2006 and 2007. It has been said that the team may have had the most dominant season in college lacrosse history, finishing the season with a record of 18–0, and 33-game winning streak. They outscored their opponents 445–80.  Head Coach Chuck Wilbur has compiled a career record of 83–11. Onondagas 2008-2009 Men's and women's lacrosse teams won the national championships for JUCO. The men's lax (lacrosse) team won the NJCAA National Championship in 2010. In the 2015 season, the Men's Lacrosse Team won its seventh straight NJCAA National Championship with its fifth straight perfect season. The men's lacrosse team set the lacrosse record for consecutive wins with 107 wins, spanning 2010 through 2016.

Tennis 
In 2009 The Men's Tennis Team won their first National Championship, after being ranked in the top 5 nationally the past 4 years. The Men's Tennis Team went 24–0 with 1st singles through 6th singles winning their league championship respectively. Head Coach John LaRose was inducted in the NJCAA Hall of Fame as one of the most successful coaches in NJCAA history. 4 out of 6 starters were individual national champions and went on to play on some top college teams.

Basketball 
The men's basketball program won the 1993 NJCAA Men's Division III Basketball Championship. Erik Saroney became the new men's basketball coach in April 2016*. Mike Wheeler is entering his fifth season as the women's basketball coach.

Ice Hockey 
The men's ice hockey team is a member of the Upstate New York Club Hockey League, having joined in 2013. The Lazers are the only community/junior college member of the UNYCHL. However, OCC did not field a team in the 2016–2017 season. They fielded a team for the first three games of their 2018–19 season, but did not play in the rest of their games. They cancelled their 2019–20 season, and the status of the team going forward is up in the air.

Notable alumni 
 Laurie Halse Anderson, author
 Grace Jones, singer, model and actress
 Mike Randall, actor and meteorologist

References

External links 
 

 
Educational institutions established in 1961
SUNY community colleges
1961 establishments in New York (state)
NJCAA athletics